Polaris Garden, also known as Bao Lai Garden Square is a 27-story,  tall residential skyscraper complex located in Xinyi Special District, Taipei, Taiwan. Designed by the Hong Kong based architectural firm P&T Group, the residential building was completed on December 31, 2007 and provides 106 units of luxury apartments. Facilities of the apartment block includes an outdoor swimming pool, sauna, garden, and Mahjong room. Famous residents include former president of Taiwan Chen Shui-bian and his family, co-founder of Breeze Center Aimee Sun and founder of PX Mart Lin Ming-Hsiung.

See also 
 List of tallest buildings in Taipei
 Tao Zhu Yin Yuan
 55 Timeless
 Cloud Top
 Kingdom of Global View

References

2007 establishments in Taiwan
Residential skyscrapers in Taiwan
Skyscrapers in Taipei
Apartment buildings in Taiwan
Residential buildings completed in 2007